This is a list of seasons completed by the UCF Knights basketball team since the team's formation in 1969. Since that season, the Knights have played over 1,100 regular-season games, winning five conference tournament championships and seven regular season championships. The Knights are a member of the American Athletic Conference (The American), and their current head coach is Johnny Dawkins, who is in his third year with the team. The Knights play their home games at CFE Arena, which is located on the main campus of UCF in Orlando, Florida.

The University of Central Florida first fielded a varsity basketball team in the fall of 1969 under Torchy Clark. Clark would complete 14 seasons as the Knights head coach, amassing a 274–89 record. Clark did not amass a single losing season during his 14-year career, and led the Knights to the Division II Final Four in 1978. His son, Bo Clark, holds the UCF records for career points (2,886) and points in a game (70). UCF has advanced to the NCAA tournament 4 times (94, 96, 04, 05), all under coach Kirk Speraw. The Knights were the 2005 Atlantic Sun Conference regular season and tournament champions, their last season in the league.

On December 1st, 2010, the Knights upset the #16 Florida Gators 57–54, for the biggest win in program history, and giving the Knights their first victory over a top 20 opponent as well as their first victory over the Gators. Following a 10–0 start to the 2010–11 season under first year coach Donnie Jones, the Knights were nationally ranked for the first time in program history. At the time, UCF was one of nine unbeaten teams, and one of only four schools to be ranked in the BCS standings and the AP men's basketball poll. The Knights continued their rise in 2011, when they upset the defending national champions and then-ranked #4 Connecticut Huskies.

Seasons

 

  UCF had its wins from the 2008–09, 2009–10, and 2010–11 seasons vacated.

References

External links

 Official Athletics Site
 University of Central Florida Official Site

 
Ucf Knights
UCF Knights basketball seasons

es:UCF Golden Knights
fr:UCF Golden Knights